The Helicis minor (musculus helicis minor or smaller muscle of helix) is a small skeletal muscle. The helicis minor is an intrinsic muscle of the outer ear. The muscle runs obliques and covers the helical crus, part of the helix located just above the tragus.

The helicis minor originates from the base of the helical crus, runs obliques and inserts at the anterior aspect of the helical crus where it curves upward above the tragus.

The function of the muscle is to assist in adjusting the shape of the anterior margin of the ear cartilage. While this is a potential action in some individuals, in the majority of individuals the muscle modifies auricular shape to a minimal degree.

The helicis minor is developmentally derived from the second pharyngeal arch It seem that only in primates is the helicis major and minor two distinctive muscles.

Additional images

See also
 Intrinsic muscles of external ear
 Helicis major

References

External links
 AnatomyExpert.com

Ear
Muscles of the head and neck